is a Japanese manga series written and illustrated by Hiromu Arakawa. It has been serialized in Square Enix's Monthly Shōnen Gangan shōnen manga anthology magazine since December 2021.

Publication 
Daemons of the Shadow Realm, written and illustrated by Hiromu Arakawa, was officially announced in the August 2021 issue of Square Enix's shōnen manga anthology magazine Monthly Shōnen Gangan in celebration of the 20th anniversary of Arakawa's previous work, Fullmetal Alchemist (2001–10). Daemons of the Shadow Realm began serialization in Monthly Shōnen Gangan on December 10, 2021.

In July 2022, Square Enix Manga & Books announced that they licensed the series for English publication, with the first volume set to be released on April 25, 2023.

Volume list

Chapters not yet in tankōbon format 
These chapters have yet to be published in a tankōbon volume.

Reception
The series ranked 19th on the 2022 "Book of the Year" list by Da Vinci magazine. It ranked 15th in the 2023 edition of Takarajimasha's Kono Manga ga Sugoi! list of best manga for male readers. It ranked 2nd in the Nationwide Bookstore Employees' Recommended Comics of 2023.

Francesco Cacciatore of Screen Rant named Daemons of the Shadow Realm as one of the best new manga titles to debut in 2021, highlighting the potential the manga shows despite only having one chapter released by the end of the year. Additionally, Cacciatore likened Daemons of the Shadow Realm to Koyoharu Gotouge's Demon Slayer: Kimetsu no Yaiba due to both series featuring a brother and sister pair as protagonists. Carlyle Edmundson of Screen Rant compared the concept of Tsugai present in the manga to that of Stands seen in Hirohiko Araki's long-running JoJo's Bizarre Adventure series.

References

External links 
  
 

Adventure anime and manga
Gangan Comics manga
Shōnen manga
Supernatural anime and manga